The 1909 Borujerd earthquake also known as Silakhor earthquake occurred in Silakhor plain (in the south of today's Borujerd County), Persia (modern day Iran) on January 23. Around 8,000 fatalities were caused directly from the magnitude 7.3 earthquake. An indefinite number of aftershocks continued for six months after the main shock. The section on this fault ruptured was the same as the main rupture zone of the 2006 Borujerd earthquake.

Earthquake 
Occurring on the local Dorood Fault, the tremor caused  of visible surface faulting.

Damage 
Sixty villages within the region were either completely destroyed or damaged beyond repair. Casualties were extensive, occurring in 130 individual villages. However, damage was contained within a  area. Eight thousand were killed in this sector along with several thousand animals. Damage was worst within the epicentral area (Silakhor Valley) and surrounding valleys populated by domestic tribes.

See also 
List of earthquakes in 1909
List of earthquakes in Iran

References

External links
M 6.1 - western Iran – United States Geological Survey
Darb e Astaneh (Silakhor) Earthquake Report: March 31, 2006; ML=6.1 – IIEES

1909 Borujerd
1909 in Iran
Borujerd
History of Lorestan Province
Borujerd County
Borujerd
January 1909 events
1909 disasters in Iran